Lotus subbiflorus, hairy bird's-foot trefoil, is a flowering plant of the pea family Fabaceae.

It is a finely hairy annual plant, growing in dry, sandy ground, often near the sea, and producing sprawling stems with clusters of two to four lemon-yellow pea-type flowers, often with some borne inverted.

Distribution
Its native distribution is in southern and western Europe and North Africa.  It occurs as a scarce plant in south-west England, southern Wales, southern Ireland and in the Channel Islands.  It also occurs as an introduced species in Hawaii and Australia.

References

subbiflorus
Flora of England